Grappenhall is a suburb of Warrington, Cheshire, in the civil parish of Grappenhall and Thelwall, which had a population of 9,377 at the 2001 census. At the 2021 census the population of the parish was 9,651.

History
Grappenhall is mentioned in the Domesday Book of 1086 with the name Gropenhale and with a valuation of five shillings.

St Wilfrid's Church has a carving of a cat on the west face of the tower. This may have been Lewis Carroll's inspiration for the grinning Cheshire Cat in Alice's Adventures in Wonderland. The church itself was first constructed in 1120, though was rebuilt 400 years later. The church was also, at a time, in the possession of the Boidelle (Boydell) family.

Along with the church, the centre of the village contains two pubs, the Parr Arms and the Ram's Head, and Grappenhall Hall Residential School (closed down) and St Wilfrid's Primary School. Bradshaw Community Primary School is located north of the village centre.

Leisure
Grappenhall Heys Walled Garden is near the village.
Grappenhall is home to the 25th Warrington East (St Wilfred's) Scout Troop.

Sport
There is a cricket ground, which is the home of Grappenhall Cricket Club. Australian cricketer Steve Smith was signed for the club for five weeks in 2007, when he was 17.

Library
The Grappenhall Community library is a community-run library in the village. It was opened by the local authority in 1959 before being handed over to the Friends of Grappenhall Library after closure on 2 April 2011 due to local authority cuts. The library is run by the Friends of the Grappenhall library who pay £10 a year to help with its upkeep.

In popular culture

Parts of the Case-Book of Sherlock Holmes were filmed in the centre of Grappenhall. The village name appears in the title of the song "Grappenhall Rag", by the Darwen singer-songwriter Bryn Haworth.

See also

Listed buildings in Grappenhall and Thelwall

References

External links

Images of the church and its cat.
Grappenhall Youth & Community Association
The Flickr Grappenhall Photography Group
WDCC, Warrington District Camera Club, which is based in Grappenhall
St Wilfrids, Grappemhall at boydellfamilyhistory.com

Villages in Cheshire
Warrington